Mohd Fauzi bin Abdul Latif (born 10 July 1996) is a Malaysian professional footballer who plays as a forward for Malaysia Super League club UiTM.

References

External links
 

Living people
Malaysian footballers
Malaysia Super League players
Negeri Sembilan FA players
UiTM FC players
Association football forwards
1996 births